The Velma Springstead Trophy is an award presented annually to Canada's outstanding female athlete. It is named in honour of track athlete Velma Springstead whose career ended prematurely when she died from pneumonia in 1927 when only 20 years old. The Women's Amateur Athletic Federation (WAAF) of Canada founded this award in 1934. The trophy, also known as the "Rose Bowl," was donated by Alexandrine Gibb, sportswriter with the Toronto Star. The trophy was to be awarded on the basis of "performance, sportsmanship and behaviour."  The award is now managed by the True Sport Foundation.

Past recipients

2012 - Rosie MacLennan, trampoline
2011 – Christine Nesbitt, speed skating
2010 – Christine Nesbitt, speed skating
2009 – Christine Nesbitt, speed skating
2008 – Chantal Petitclerc, Athletics
2007 – Kalyna Roberge, speed skating
2006 – Cindy Klassen, speed skating
2005 – Cindy Klassen, speed skating
2004 – Chantal Petitclerc, wheelchair athletics
2003 – Perdita Felicien, track and field
2002 – Catriona Le May Doan, speed skating
2001 – Catriona Le May Doan, speed skating
2000 – Caroline Brunet, canoeing
1999 – Caroline Brunet, canoeing
1998 – Catriona Le May Doan, speed skating
1997 – Caroline Brunet, canoeing
1996 – Alison Sydor, cycling
1995 – Alison Sydor, cycling
1994 – Myriam Bédard, biathlon
1993 – Kate Pace, alpine skiing
1992 – Kerrin Lee-Gartner, alpine skiing
1991 – Silken Laumann, rowing
1990 – Sylvie Daigle, speed skating
1989 – Heather Houston, curling
1988 – Carolyn Waldo, synchronized swimming
1987 – Carolyn Waldo, synchronized swimming
1986 – Carolyn Waldo, synchronized swimming
1985 – Carolyn Waldo, synchronized swimming
1984 – Linda Thom, shooting
1983 – Lynn Chronobrywy, modern pentathlon
1982 – Angella Taylor-Issajenko, track and field
1981 – Susan Nattrass, shooting
1980 – Angella Taylor-Issajenko, track and field
1979 – Helen Vanderberg, synchronized swimming
1978 – Diane Jones-Konihowski, track and field & Cathy Sherk, golfer
1977 – Sylvia Burka, cycling & Susan Nattrass, shooting
1976 – Cheryl Gibson, swimming
1975 – Nancy Garapick, swimming & Diane Jones, track and field
1974 – Wendy Cook, swimming
1973 – Karen Magnussen, figure skating
1972 – Karen Magnussen, figure skating1971 – Karen Magnussen, figure skating
1970 –
1969 – Linda Crutchfield-Bocock, luge
1968 –
1967 –
1966 – Elaine Tanner, swimming
1965 – Petra Burka, figure skating
1964 – Gail Daley, artistic gymnastics
1963 – Nancy McCredie, track and field
1962 – Mary Stewart, swimming
1961 – Mary Stewart, swimming
1960 – Anne Heggtveit, skiing
1959 – Anne Heggtveit, skiing
1958 – Lucille Wheeler, skiing
1957 – Marlene Streit, golfer
1956 – Marlene Streit, golfer
1955 –
1954 –
1953 – Marlene Streit, golfer
1952 – Marlene Streit, golfer
1951 –
1950 – Rosella Thorne , track and field (sprinter)
1949 – Eleanor McKenzie, track and field (sprinter)
1948 – Viola Myers, track and field
1947 – Barbara Ann Scott, figure skater
1946 – Irene Strong, swimmer
1945 – Barbara Ann Scott, figure skater
1944 – Rhona Wurtele and Rhoda Wurtele, skiing
1943 – Joan Langdon, swimming
1942 – Joan Langdon, swimming
1941 – Mary Rose Thacker, figure skating
1940 – Dorothy Walton, badminton
1939 – Jeanette Dolson, track and field
1938 – Noel MacDonald, basketball
1937 – Robina Higgins, track and field
1936 – Betty Taylor, track and field
1935 – Aileen Meagher, track and field
1934 – Phyllis Dewar, swimming

See also

 Bobbie Rosenfeld Award
Lionel Conacher Award
 Lou Marsh Trophy
Athlete of the Year

Further reading
Hall, M. Ann (2002), The girl and the game : a history of women's sport in Canada, Broadview Press

External links
True Sport Foundation: Canadian Sport Awards

References

1934 establishments in Canada
Canadian sports trophies and awards
Most valuable player awards
Awards established in 1934